ETRS89 is a headland on the  peninsula in Lochaber, Highland, Scotland, notable for being the most westerly point on the island of Great Britain. It is  further west than Land's End in Cornwall.

Ardnamurchan Point is commonly, but incorrectly, described as the most westerly point on the peninsula.

 means 'great, tapering field' in Scottish Gaelic.

See also 
 Mull of Galloway – Scotland's most southerly point
 Dunnet Head – Scotland's most northerly point on the mainland
 Keith Inch – Scotland's most easterly point on the mainland
 List of extreme points of the United Kingdom

References

Headlands of Scotland
Ardnamurchan
Landforms of Highland (council area)